The Delaware Wings was an American soccer club that was a member of the American Soccer League.

Coach
 Al Barrish
 Charles Duccilli (1974)

Year-by-year

See also
 Central Delaware SA Future
 Delaware Dynasty
 Delaware Wizards
 List of professional sports teams in Delaware

References

Defunct soccer clubs in Delaware
American Soccer League (1933–1983) teams
1972 establishments in Delaware
1974 disestablishments in Delaware
Soccer clubs in Delaware
Association football clubs established in 1972
Association football clubs disestablished in 1974